Shane McCarthy (born 24 July 1975) is an Australian writer best known for his comic book work.

Career
A comic book fan from an early age, McCarthy's first widely published work was the three-part Batman backup story Low for DC Comics in 2004, beginning in Detective Comics #797. McCarthy later was responsible for a reinvention of the Riddler character in the five-part Riddle Me That beginning in Batman: Legends of the Dark Knight #185 (2005) and followed it up with Victims in Detective Comics #816 (2006), pitting Batman against Zsasz.

Other published works include Zombies: Feast for IDW Publishing and contributions to Event Horizon for Mam Tor Publishing, and Star Wars Tales for Dark Horse.

McCarthy completed a twelve-part Transformers series entitled All Hail Megatron for IDW Publishing. He is the creator of the character Drift.

His work appears in Marvel's Dark X-Men: The Beginning #1.

McCarthy formerly ran a swing dancing school in Perth Western Australia.

Bibliography
Transformers for IDW Publishing
All Hail Megatron (12 issues, 2008–2009)
Spotlight: Blurr (one-shot, 2008)
Spotlight: Drift (one-shot, 2009)
Spotlight: Cliffjumper (one-shot, 2009)
The Transformers: Drift (4 issues, 2010)
Mars Attacks: The Transformers (one-shot, 2013)
The Transformers: Drift - Empire of Stone (4 issues, 2014–2015)

Batman for DC Comics
Low "Detective Comics" #797 - #799 (2004)
Riddle Me That "Batman: Legends of The Dark Knight" #185 - #189 (2005)
Victims "Detective Comics" #815 - #816 (2006)

Others:
 "Black Eight"  in Star Wars Tales #21 (2004)
Event Horizon #1 (2005)
Event Horizon #2 (2005)
Zombies! Feast (2006)
Dark X-Men: The Beginning #1 (2009)

References

External links

Interview with Pulse News 11 January 2006
Interview about All Hail Megatron with Newsarama April 2008

Writers from Western Australia
Dance teachers
Living people
1975 births
Australian comics writers